Deena Ram (born 1964 in Rajasthan state) is a former Indian track and field athlete who specialised in the 3000 meters steeplechase. He won the gold medal at the 1989 Asian Athletics Championships and the silver medal at Asian Games. He was awarded Arjuna Award in 1990.

He also participated in the steeplechase at the 1991 World Championships. He was coached by Illyas Babar.

References 

1964 births
Living people
Athletes from Rajasthan
Indian male middle-distance runners
Indian male steeplechase runners
Asian Games medalists in athletics (track and field)
Athletes (track and field) at the 1990 Asian Games
Recipients of the Arjuna Award
Asian Games silver medalists for India
Medalists at the 1990 Asian Games